The following men have been archbishops of the Roman Catholic Archdiocese of Freiburg.

References

Sources
Archdiocese of Freiburg - catholic-hierarchy.org 

 
Freiburg